Arsenije Pešić (born June 10, 1955) is a Serbian former professional basketball player.

Playing career 
Pešić played most of this career for Partizan. He was a member of the trophy generation led by Dragan Kićanović and Dražen Dalipagić in the late 1970s and early 1980s. He won two Korać Cups and two Yugoslav championships with the Partizan. 

Pešić played the first half of the 1987–88 season for Segafredo Gorizia of Italian Serie A2. He averaged 17.4 points, 8.4 rebounds and 1.0 assists per game, oven nine games. Also, he played for Sloboda Tuzla and for Vojvodina where he finished his playing career after 1988–89 season.

Career achievements and awards 
 FIBA Korać Cup winner: 2 (with Partizan: 1977–78, 1978–79)
 Yugoslav League champion: 2 (with Partizan: 1978–79, 1980–81)
 Yugoslav Cup winner: 2 (with Partizan: 1978–79; with IMT: 1986–87)

References

1955 births
Living people
KK IMT Beograd players
KK Partizan players
KK Vojvodina players
KK Sloboda Tuzla players
People from Berane
Power forwards (basketball)
Serbian men's basketball players
Serbian expatriate basketball people in Bosnia and Herzegovina
Serbian expatriate basketball people in Italy
Serbs of Montenegro
Yugoslav men's basketball players